Don McNeill defeated Bobby Riggs 7–5, 6–0, 6–3 in the final to win the men's singles tennis title at the 1939 French Championships.

Seeds
The seeded players are listed below. Don McNeill is the champion; others show the round in which they were eliminated.

 Bobby Riggs (finalist)
 Franjo Punčec (quarterfinals)

Draw

Key
 Q = Qualifier
 WC = Wild card
 LL = Lucky loser
 r = Retired

Finals

Earlier rounds

Section 1

Section 2

Section 3

Section 4

References

External links

1939 in French tennis
1939